Yuliya Milko-Chernomorets (born 11 October 1975) is a Belarusian freestyle skier. She competed in the women's moguls event at the 1998 Winter Olympics.

References

External links
 

1975 births
Living people
Belarusian female freestyle skiers
Olympic freestyle skiers of Belarus
Freestyle skiers at the 1998 Winter Olympics
Sportspeople from Minsk